Elachista essymena is a moth of the family Elachistidae. It is found in Australia, where it has been recorded from Tasmania.

References

Moths described in 2011
essymena
Moths of Australia